Carlo J. Caparas' Gagambino is a Philippine television drama fantasy series broadcast by GMA Network. The series is based from Carlo J. Caparas' graphic novel of the same title. Directed by Topel Lee and Don Michael Perez, it stars Dennis Trillo in the title role. It premiered on October 20, 2008 on the network's Telebabad line up replacing Dyesebel. The series concluded on February 20, 2009 with a total of 90 episodes. It was replaced by Totoy Bato in its timeslot.

Production
When GMA Network bought the rights to Carlo J. Caparas' graphic novel in February 2007, Richard Gutierrez was attached to star. The series was shelved until 2008, but Gutierrez opted to work on his dream project: Codename: Asero. The network decided that they could not longer delay the series and gave the role to Dennis Trillo, over another heavy contender: JC de Vera, who later joined the cast in LaLola.

Director Topel Lee required Trillo to learn three martial arts in preparation for the role: wing chun, judo and kendo (a Japanese martial art of sword-fighting). He also underwent training for parkour.

Premise
Gambino "Bino" Bayani and his adventures with his giant spider as they fight evil forces in a darker, crime-infested re-imagination of Manila. Bino and his group of friends, all possessing insect-like superpowers like him, are pitted against Abresia, a terrorist mastermind and a very powerful woman who can command giant insects.

Cast and characters

Lead cast
 Dennis Trillo as Gambino "Bino" Bayani

Supporting cast
 Raymart Santiago as Dindo Gutierrez
 Polo Ravales as Harold Santiago
 Katrina Halili as Lucy Gutierrez / Lady Mantisa
 Nadine Samonte as Celine Lopez
 Isabel Oli  as Bernadette Albuento / Alakdanessa
 Glaiza de Castro as Leah Albuento / Super Bee
 Jennica Garcia as Gelay L. Bayani
 Jean Garcia as Abresia / Divina M. Lopez-Gutierrez
 Mart Escudero as Noel Albuento
 Glydel Mercado as Rebecca Bayani-Santiago
 Jan Manual as Eldon
 Benjie Paras as Stalin
 Krista Kleiner as Krissa

Guest cast
 Zoren Legaspi as Armand Santiago
 Bernadette Allyson as Elena Bayani
 John Arcilla as Alejandro Bayani

Ratings
According to AGB Nielsen Philippines' Mega Manila household television ratings, the pilot episode of Gagambino earned a 34.5% rating. While the final episode scored a 34.7% rating.

References

External links
 

2008 Philippine television series debuts
2009 Philippine television series endings
Fantaserye and telefantasya
Filipino-language television shows
GMA Network drama series
Superhero television shows
Television shows based on comics
Television shows set in the Philippines